Eleutherodactylus pituinus is a species of frog in the family Eleutherodactylidae endemic to the Cordillera Central, Dominican Republic, at elevations of  asl. Its natural habitats are upland pinewoods and forests. It is threatened by habitat loss caused by agriculture and by disturbance from ecotourism. Also chytridiomycosis is a threat.

References

pituinus
Endemic fauna of the Dominican Republic
Amphibians of the Dominican Republic
Amphibians described in 1965
Taxa named by Albert Schwartz (zoologist)
Taxonomy articles created by Polbot